Bang Mot or Bang Mod may refer to:
Bang Mot, Chom Thong, a subdistrict of Bangkok
Bang Mot, Thung Khru, a subdistrict of Bangkok, adjacent to the above
Khlong Bang Mot, a canal in Bangkok
Bang Mot tangerine, a tangerine cultivar grown in the area
King Mongkut's University of Technology Thonburi, commonly nicknamed Bangmod after the location of its main campus
72nd Anniversary Stadium (Bang Mod), also in the area